Wang Hao (February 1930 – 1 January 2023) was a Chinese major general (shaojiang) of the People's Liberation Army (PLA) who served as political commissioner of National University of Defense Technology between 1983 and 1990.

Biography
Wang was born in Shanghai, in February 1930, while his ancestral home is in Changzhou, Jiangsu. In 1952, he graduated from Tsinghua University and taught at PLA Military Institute of Engineering. He joined the Chinese Communist Party (CCP) in that same year.

In 1979, he joined the faculty of National University of Defense Technology. He was named director of Department of Systems Engineering and Applied Mathematics in 1982. After this office was terminated in 1983, he became political commissioner of the university, serving until 1990.

Wang was promoted to the rank of major general (shaojiang) in 1988.

References

1930 births
2023 deaths
People from Shanghai
Tsinghua University alumni
Academic staff of the National University of Defense Technology
People's Liberation Army generals from Shanghai